Fraten is the fourth album by the Finnish experimental rock band Circle. It was released in 1997 by Metamorphos.

Track listing

Personnel
T. Elo
T. Harrivaara
J. Lehtisalo
T. Niemelä
J. Peltomäki
V. Raitio

References

Circle (band) albums
1997 albums